Karl Moffat (born July 31, 1959), better known by the ring name Jason the Terrible, is a Canadian professional wrestler. He is best known for his appearances with Stampede Wrestling and in Japan.

Professional wrestling career 
In August 1981, Moffat attacked a Stampede Wrestling wrestler in the ring, and was tackled through the ropes onto a table.

Moffat debuted in Stu Hart's Stampede Wrestling promotion in 1983 under the name Karl "Butch" Moffat. During the mid-1980s, he would win several tag team titles including (Vancouver) All Star Tag Team Championship and the Grand Prix Tag Team Championship in 1984 and 1985. He also had a successful singles career with the World Wrestling Council in Puerto Rico, twice winning that promotion's Television Championship as well as its Caribbean and Tag Team titles between 1987 and 1989.

Moffat also had a successful run with Stampede Wrestling, feuding with Owen Hart as Jason the Terrible, with white overalls, a hockey mask, and a chainsaw. However, Bret Hart claims that he was bleeding too much in his matches. Ross Hart agrees, saying that "it was a bit of a turn off with our audience", although Ross also stated that Moffatt was a good wrestler and that he was a big fan of his character.

Moffat won the Canadian Rocky Mountain Wrestling North American Championship twice in 1993 and 1994, winning it from Chris Jericho and Eric Freeze. On September 23, 1994, he teamed with Randy Rudd and defeated Sonny Corleone and Rob Austin to win the Canadian Rocky Mountain Wrestling Tag Team Championships.

In 1998, he wrestled two matches for Steve Wilde and Otto Gentile's Can-Am Wrestling Federation, losing to both Dr. Hannibal (in a Falls count anywhere match) and the Cuban Assassin. In 2004, Moffat wrestled three matches in Top Ranked Wrestling, one singles match and two tag team matches. He won his first singles match, before winning one and losing one of the tag-team matches.

Later that year, Moffat lost to R.A.G.E. in All Star Pro Wrestling, in what was his final match.

Karl Moffatt made his return to the ring under the Jason the Terrible gimmick for Real Canadian Wrestling in Edmonton where he teamed with Katana to face C-Block in a bloody street fight. Moffatt return to RCW March 2013 to win the Canadian Tag titles with Partner Steven Styles by defeating C-Block in a Bloody brawl.

Jason/Styles lost the tag titles to The Hardliners on May 24 in Camrose, Alberta.

Moffat, as Jason The Terrible did do a show for Hart Legacy Wrestling in Calgary, Alberta, but he and other wrestlers were not paid.

Personal life 
Moffat says that he wasn't friends with most wrestlers, he kept his personal and professional life separate.

While travelling with fellow Stampede Wrestling veterans Davey Boy Smith and Chris Benoit, Moffat suffered massive injuries to his left leg following a head-on collision in Jasper, Alberta on July 4, 1989. It took five years and nine operations to put him back together. That injury shortened his career.

Moffat is currently a truck driver in British Columbia.

Championships and accomplishments 
Atlantic Grand Prix Wrestling
Grand Prix Tag Team Championship (1 time) – with Karl Krupp
Canadian Rocky Mountain Wrestling
CRMW North American Championship (2 times)
CRMW Tag Team Championship (1 time) – with Randy Rudd
Northern Championship Wrestling
NCW World Tag Team Championship (1 time) – with Wild Warrior
Pro Wrestling Illustrated
PWI ranked him # 348 of the 500 best singles wrestlers of the PWI 500 in 1991
Real Canadian Wrestling
RCW Canadian Tag Team Championship (1 time)
Top Ranked Wrestling
TRW Tag Team Championship (1 time) – with Machete Singh
Vancouver All Star Wrestling
NWA Canadian Tag Team Championship (Vancouver version) (1 time) – with Spider Webb
World Wrestling Council
WWC Caribbean Heavyweight Championship (3 times) 
WWC World Tag Team Championship (1 time) - with Steve Strong
WWC World Television Championship (3 times)
WWC Puerto Rico Heavyweight Championship (1 time)
WWC World Junior Heavyweight Championship (1 time)
Zero1 USA
 Zero1 USA Underground Championship (1 time)

References

Sources
McCoy, Heath. Pain and Passion: The History of Stampede Wrestling. Toronto: CanWest Books, 2005. 
Meltzer, Dave. Tributes II: Remembering More of the World's Greatest Wrestlers. Champaign, Illinois: Sports Publishing LLC, 2004.

External links
 

1960 births
Canadian male professional wrestlers
Living people
Masked wrestlers
Professional wrestlers from Ontario
Stampede Wrestling alumni
20th-century professional wrestlers
21st-century professional wrestlers
WWC Puerto Rico Champions
WWC Television Champions